Amurskoye is a rural locality (a selo) and the administrative center of Amursky Selsoviet of Belogorsky District, Amur Oblast, Russia. The population was 946 as of 2018. There are 14 streets.

Geography 
Amurskoye is located 32 km southeast of Belogorsk (the district's administrative centre) by road. Vozzhayevka is the nearest rural locality.

References 

Rural localities in Belogorsky District